Bad Luck Creek is a stream in Hardin County, Texas, in the United States.

According to tradition, Bad Luck was so named after a local settler was shot in the crossfire of a skirmish.

See also
List of rivers of Texas

References

Rivers of Hardin County, Texas
Rivers of Texas